Isidro "Isi" Ros Ríos (born 6 November 1995) is a Spanish footballer who plays for Real Avilés CF as a left winger.

Club career
Born in Las Torres de Cotillas, Region of Murcia, Ros joined CD Plus Ultra's youth system from AD Cotillas CF. He made his senior debut in 2013, while on loan at CD Beniel.

In January 2014, Ros was loaned to Elche CF to finish his development. He returned to Plus Ultra in June, and scored a career-best 17 goals during the season of Tercera División.

Ros signed with UCAM Murcia CF in Segunda División B on 9 July 2015. He contributed 21 matches and one goal in his first year – playoffs included – as the club achieved promotion to Segunda División for the first time ever. He made his professional debut on 12 October 2016, coming on as a late substitute for Juan José Collantes in a 2–1 away win against RCD Mallorca in the third round of the Copa del Rey.

On 5 January 2017, Ros was loaned to third-tier FC Cartagena in a short-term deal. After being released by UCAM he continued competing at that level, with Recreativo de Huelva (on loan from AD Alcorcón), CD Badajoz (where he failed to make any appearances due to a left-knee injury) and CD Atlético Baleares.

Personal life
Ros' father, also named Isidro, died in 2008 of a heart attack shortly before the start of a training session with Cotillas' youths. His 13-year-old son was part of the squad, and was present at the event.

References

External links

1995 births
Living people
Spanish footballers
Footballers from the Region of Murcia
Association football wingers
Segunda División B players
Tercera División players
Primera Federación players
Segunda Federación players
UCAM Murcia CF players
UCAM Murcia CF B players
FC Cartagena footballers
AD Alcorcón footballers
Recreativo de Huelva players
CD Badajoz players
CD Atlético Baleares footballers
Real Avilés CF footballers